Xiphophorus montezumae, the Montezuma swordtail, is a livebearing freshwater fish of the order Cyprinodontiformes, family Poeciliidae, and genus Xiphophorus. It is in the same genus as the common platy and the swordtail. Xiphophorus means 'sword-tail' in Greek.

Description
The genus Xiphophorus is common in freshwater aquariums. The males of this particular species are known for their metallic green scales and the fact that their "sword" stays horizontal unlike most species where it is angled downward.

Water pH should stay near 7.5 at all times. They come from the Pánuco River basin in northeastern Mexico in the states of Tamaulipas, San Luis Potosi and Veracruz. They are often found in fast-flowing rivers. In the wild, schools with more females than males are common, and they enjoy dense aquatic foliage to give birth in. They reproduce quickly and often, and  On average, females will give birth to about 50 fry once every seven weeks. Like almost all swordtails, the Montezuma swordtail will readily breed with platies.

References

General references

Live-bearing fish
Ovoviviparous fish
montezumae
Freshwater fish of Mexico
Fish described in 1899
Taxa named by David Starr Jordan
Taxa named by John Otterbein Snyder